Labrador Records is a Sweden-based record label, specializing in indie pop and the twee subgenre.

History
Labrador was founded by Bengt Rahm in 1997 in Malmö, modeled on niche British record companies and Swedish fanzines like A Zero One and Benno. One of the first bands to be signed was the Swedish group Club 8. Club 8 member Johan Angergård had previously run the Summersound Recordings record company together with members of the band Acid House Kings. Eventually, Summersound and Labrador joined under the moniker Labrador Records and the new company's headquarters were transferred to Stockholm. 
Johan Angergård was responsible for "everything that had to do with the music" while the graphic designer Mattias Berglund handled covers, websites, and posters. Bengt Rahm remained as a partner. In 2018 Johan Angergård decided to step back and tend to other business. Since then the label has been run by founder Bengt Rahm.

Artists

Current
Tan Cologne
Jesper Zacco
Acid House Kings
Club 8
Det Vackra Livet
ingenting
Johan Hedberg
The Legends
Little Big Adventure
Amanda Mair
The Mary Onettes
Pallers
Pelle Carlberg
Sambassadeur
The Sound of Arrows
Starlet
Suburban Kids with Biblical Names

Earlier
Aerospace
Cinnamon
Afraid of Stairs
Happydeadmen
Airliner
Chasing Dorotea
Corduroy Utd.
Irene
Douglas Heart
Edson
Lasse Lindh
Laurel Music
Leslies
Loveninjas
Mondial
Ronderlin
South Ambulance
The Sound of Arrows
Tribeca
Waltz for Debbie
Wan Light
The Radio Dept.

See also 
 List of record labels

References

External links 
 Official site

Swedish independent record labels
Indie pop record labels